Biraco is the acronym of Bismuth, Radium, and Cobalt. It was the name of  a now-defunct subsidiary company of Union Minière du Haut Katanga (UMHK) and Société Générale de Belgique created to refine these elements from the copper and uranium ores coming from the  Katanga province in the Democratic Republic of Congo.

Radium was first industrially produced  in the beginning of the 20th century by Biraco in its Olen plant near Antwerp in Belgium.

UMHK offered to Marie Curie her first gramme of radium.

The radium production plant was demolished during the years 1970 and the radium production wastes confined in a shallowly buried vault. The Olen site is still the object of remediation works financed by Umicore in the frame of its historical liability.

Union Minière activities were merged with those of three other companies to create Umicore in 1989.

See also

 Radium
 Bismuth
 Cobalt
 Société Générale de Belgique
 Union Minière du Haut Katanga
 Umicore

External links
 Umicore

References

Defunct companies of Belgium
Société Générale de Belgique
Uranium mining companies of Belgium
Companies based in Antwerp Province